"Sheep" (Chinese: 羊) is a single recorded by Chinese rapper Lay for his solo album Lay 02 Sheep. The song was released on October 7, 2017 by S.M. Entertainment. Lay and Norwegian DJ Alan Walker released a remix on August 31, 2018.

Music video 
A teaser for the music video was released on October 6, 2017 by S.M. Entertainment. The music video was released on October 7, Lay's birthday.

Live performance 
Lay performed "Sheep" for the first time during the album premiere held at the Beijing National Aquatics Center on October 12, 2017. He subsequently performed the song at the reality talent show, The Next Season 2.

Lay performed a remix of "Sheep" at Lollapalooza alongside Alan Walker on August 3, 2018 in Chicago, Illinois, making it his first American appearance in the United States.

Charts

Awards

Release history

References 

2017 songs
2017 singles
Chinese-language songs
SM Entertainment singles
Lay Zhang songs